Grand Canyon–Parashant National Monument (sometimes referred to as Parashant National Monument) is located on the northern edge of the Grand Canyon in northwest Arizona, on the Arizona Strip.  The monument was established by Presidential Proclamation 7265 on January 11, 2000.

Description
The national monument is a very remote and undeveloped place jointly managed by the National Park Service (NPS) and the Bureau of Land Management (BLM). There are no paved roads into the monument and no visitor services. The  monument is larger than the state of Rhode Island. The NPS portion contains  of lands that were previously part of Lake Mead National Recreation Area. Grand Canyon–Parashant is not considered a separate unit of the NPS because its NPS area is counted in Lake Mead National Recreation Area.

The Interagency Information Center is located in the BLM Office in St. George, Utah.

The name Parashant is derived from the Paiute word Pawteh 'ee oasoasant, meaning "tanned elk hide," or "softening of the elk hide."

There are a number of ruins of former Mormon settlements in the area, such as the Oak Grove Dairy.

Wilderness areas
Grand Canyon–Parashant includes the following wilderness areas:
 Grand Wash Cliffs Wilderness
 Mount Logan Wilderness
 Mount Trumbull Wilderness
 Paiute Wilderness (part)

Cave animals
So far, a 2005 expedition to examine 24 caves in the park has produced two new species of millipede, the first barklouse discovered in North America, a whole new genus of cricket and four new cricket species.

See also
 List of national monuments of the United States

References

External links 

National Park Service National Monuments in Arizona
Grand Canyon, North Rim
Bureau of Land Management National Monuments
Bureau of Land Management areas in Arizona
Protected areas of Mohave County, Arizona
Protected areas established in 2000
2000 establishments in Arizona
Units of the National Landscape Conservation System